Tricholoma manzanitae is a mushroom of the agaric genus Tricholoma. It was formally described in 1983.

See also
List of North American Tricholoma
List of Tricholoma species

References

manzanitae
Fungi described in 1983
Fungi of North America